Hedera cypria, is a species of Ivy (genus Hedera) which is endemic to the island of Cyprus. It is an evergreen climbing plant, growing slowly to 20–30 m high where suitable surfaces are available, and also growing as ground cover where there are no vertical surfaces. It climbs by means of aerial rootlets which cling to the substrate. It is more common at higher altitudes in rocky, shadowy riverine forest, over 400–650 m. In its natural habitat it can be distinguished easily from Hedera helix subsp. poetarum, also present, because the latter has yellow fruits, while Hedera cypria is always black-fruited.

Hedera cypria does not resemble any other ivy into such a unique white patterns conspicuous grey veining, red stemmed. It is an attractive robust plant, growing slowly. It has alternate and small to medium ovate leaves, with a long petiole; there are two types of leaves, palmately five-lobed juvenile leaves on creeping and climbing stems, and unlobed lauroid adult leaves on fertile flowering stems. In this species, the juvenile leaves are almost unlobed with an isosceles triangle shape, and the green leave is blotched with a grid of leaf-nerves greenish-yellow to grey.

Hedera cypria is closely related to Hedera pastuchovii. Hedera cypria is found on the island of Cyprus and H. pastuchowii is distributed in close proximity in Iran, Caucasus and Transcaucassus. The DNA analysis confirmed that they are not strongly separated  but they must to be separated into distinct species, due largely to genetic differences that occur between other traits in the presence of distinct white markings over the veins in its young leaves as compared to less distinct white markings in young H. pastuchowii leaves, coupled with greater vigour in H. cypria plants.

References

External links

cypria
Flora of Cyprus
Endemic flora of Cyprus
Plants described in 1993